The Moskvitch 412 (Moskvich 412, Москвич-412, M-412) is a supermini car produced by Soviet/Russian manufacturer MZMA/AZLK in Moscow from 1967 to 1975, and by IZh in Izhevsk from 1967 to 1982 (also known as IZh-412). It was a more powerful and prestigious version of the M-408 model, offering more features for a higher price.

Design
The Moskvitch 412 derived from the Moskvitch 408, differing in more powerful 1.5 engine. The earliest engines for the 412 were built in 1964. The Moskvitch 412 had a slanted (to a tilt of 20 degrees) inline-four engine with a block, head, and inlet manifold cast in aluminium alloy to keep the engine weight down, and a hemispherical combustion chamber. Steel cylinder liners were replaceable to enable easy repair of the engine instead of having to replace it entirely. Since it was of an OHC design, it was taller than the OHV MZMA-408 engine it replaced, which is why it was mounted at a slant. The UZAM-412 had a capacity of   c.c. and developed 75 horsepower. Its more powerful version, the Moskvitch-412-2V, had 100 h.p. and was installed on sports cars. The  UZAM-412 engine, with a light alloy block, was designed by Igor I. Okunev. According to some observers, it bore some similarities to the contemporary BMW M 115 motor used in the BMW 1500 model, although in other ways they are different from each other. The similarity between the two engines is purely superficial and limited only to the tilt angle of the cylinder block and between the valves and the gear of the overhead camshaft. The gearbox inherited from the M-408 was improved, with the gearbox ratios being revised to make better use of the increased power output. Until early 1969, M412 had the gear lever on the steering column, just like M-408 , and did not have bucket seats, but a front bench, making M408 and 412 very hard to distinguish. From  early 1969 on, because a new improved gearbox was installed in order to make a better use of the power and torque and to improve performances, M-412 had the gear lever mounted on the floor. The M-408 had the gear lever mounted on the floor since late 1973. Initially, the 412 was designed as a replacement for the 408, but they ended up being built together at the same plant. The decision to keep 408 in production was that it was more suited to harsh conditions than the 412; it could tolerate 75 octane fuel and could work with lower grade oils.
Between 1967 and 1969, the only difference between 408 and 412 was usually a badge, placed on the rear of the car trunk lid ( near the Moskvitch name or opposite ), on the front fenders or on the front radiator grill. The badge was usually 412, but sometimes it was also 1500, depending on version and market.   

In 1969, both the 412 and the related 408 had their bodies redesigned. These were notable for being the first Moskvitch models to feature rectangular headlights and horizontal rear lights, which passed on to the 2138/2140 in 1976, replacing round headlights (two on ordinary models, four mainly on export models) and vertical rear lights. Only rear triangular turn signals remained on vestigial tailfins. Until then, the M-412 profited from heightened tailfins and tanned headlight lamps on export models. The first series Moskvich 412 (1967-1969) is quite rare today as they were more expensive and thus built in lower numbers than the 408. Another notable (but not unique, as it was used in other Russian cars at the time) feature were the so-called side signals, mounted on the C-pillars on some vehicles and similar to the American "opera lights". The designers "had paid real attention to passive safety," the car was crash-tested, met the standards of safety adopted by the UNECE, and received an international safety certificate as a result of almost five months of tests in France. It was upgraded with dual-circuit braking system with power assistance (servo), disc brakes on the front wheels since 1970 (models with front drum brakes continued to be built, but for certain markets, like western Europe, were delivered with brake discs, but even in East Europe models with brake discs at the front were available, in parallel with drum brakes versions), reinforced car-body structure, and passive safety features such as soft grip steering wheel cover, soft interior parts, seat belts, and padded dashboard. It was the first Moskvitch to pass safety-features tests in France, Bulgaria, Czechoslovakia, and Sweden in 1970–71, and in Western Germany in 1972. The modernized model, both for export and domestic market, received a factory code M-412IE (IE for "export rendition"), to mark, that it fulfils new safety requirements.

SATRA Motors entered M-412s in the Group One Production Saloon Car Championship in 1972 and 1973, where it easily beat "sharp-handling but underpowered" Hillman Imps and Austin Minis. It also placed 1-2-3 in the 1973 Avon Round Britain Rally and scored a class win in the South Africa Safari Rally the same year.

Trims and models

Moskvitch
M-412, the base sedan model that underwent various adaptations marked by adding different letters such as "E", "I", "U", "P", etc. to its name. They usually meant the class of the vehicle (as in luxury residential, commercial, governmental, sports, export, and so on) and were preferred over precising words used on earlier models.
М-427, a station wagon on the same base, produced from 1969, replacing the M-426 wagon. In 1972, this got a new one-piece upward-hinged tailgate. AZLK stopped making these in 1976; IZh continued with production until 1982. Starting 1971, the base of this model served to create the Izh-2125 hatchback (see below).
M-434, which was the unibody sedan delivery and pickup variant that succeeded the M-433 straight from 1967 to 1973 (thereafter it was replaced by the IZh-2715 that increased in popularity by that time). Both this model and the M-427 kept their rear light tailfin design until 1982, and passed it on to M-2137 variants from 1975.

IZh

IZh-412  practically similar to M-412, with slight changes in the frontal grille, most notably retaining twin round headlights. The car was still marketed as Moskvich 412 and had such name on a rear hood, while IZh-412 was a factory designation. After a facelift in 1982 it received a black grille with indicators on outer sides of headlights, and hollow door handles (factory code IZh-412-028), and remained in production until 1997.
IZh-427 was a duplicate of the M-427, with no other changes beside the company logo. The car, however, entered in production only in 1971 because of the abundance in Moskvitch variants.
IZh-2125 – surnamed "Kombi", was the first Soviet hatchback series produced from 1973 to 1982, then after a facelift as IZh-21251. It was then kept in production until 1997.
IZh-2715 was IZh's panel van variant with a high roof, produced from 1972 until 2001. In 1982 it underwent a facelift, along with other IZh models (IZh-2715-01 code).
IZh-27151 was IZh's pick-up truck, produced from 1974 until 2001. After a facelift in 1982 it was designated IZh-27151-01, or IZh-27151-013-01 in lengthened version.

Relationship to the M-408

The original M-412 of 1967–69 had a chassis identical to that of the Moskvitch-408, which had been launched three years earlier in 1964. The only differences between the two models were the engines and the interior.

The main differences between the Moskvitch-412 and the Moskvitch-408 were:

The differences between the 412/408 chassis:

Prototype variants
In 1970, Moskvitch built a prototype of the M-353, a restyled hatchback version of the M-412 that was larger but recognizably related. The M-355 of 1972 was larger still, with  greater length,  more wheelbase, and   more width. This made both the interior and the boot noticeably larger. The M-355 was further developed into the M-356 between 1973–1975, with "much bolder front end styling", new suspension, and an enlarged  version of the Moskvitch-DM with twin Zenith carburetors, giving , with a Borg-Warner transmission planned. None were built.

Grilles

Modifications

Sales in the UK
The M-412 was launched in the United Kingdom in 1969, when the first 20 dealerships were set up and some 300 cars were sold. Sales increased annually and peaked in 1973, when 3462 cars were sold through a 268-dealer network, but collapsed to 344 in 1975. Although the car was designed with attention to passive safety and passed safety tests in France, Bulgaria, Czechoslovakia, Sweden, and Western Germany, receiving an international safety certificate as a result of almost five months of tests in Montlhéry, the publication of a Consumers Association report in 1973 branding the car as "dangerously unsafe" did not help the Moskvich in the marketplace, even though its safety record was in response publicly defended by the managing director of the importing company, citing positive reviews from Moskvitch owners involved in traffic collisions. The 1973 introduction of the significantly more modern Lada 1200 was likely the principal cause of the sales drop. Importer Satra's 1974 rebranding of the M-412 to the Moskvitch-1500 had no effect, forcing the company to withdraw from the UK market in 1976.

References

Citations

Bibliography

Cars introduced in 1967
412
Subcompact cars
1960s cars
1970s cars
1980s cars
1990s cars
Soviet automobiles
Cars of Russia